"Forward Motion" is the second single released in 2009 by the Christian rock band Thousand Foot Krutch from their album Welcome to the Masquerade.

Chart performance 
"Forward Motion" charted on the Billboard Hot Christian Songs chart at No. 44.

Personnel 
 Trevor McNevan - vocals, guitar
 Joel Bruyere - bass
 Steve Augustine - drums
 Aaron Sprinkle - keyboards

References

2009 singles
Thousand Foot Krutch songs
2009 songs
Tooth & Nail Records singles
Songs written by Trevor McNevan